Eeva Turunen (née Viljanen; born 22 June 1933 in Valkjärvi) is a Finnish secondary school teacher and politician. She was a member of the Parliament of Finland from 1983 to 1995, representing the National Coalition Party.

References

1933 births
Living people
People from Priozersky District
National Coalition Party politicians
Members of the Parliament of Finland (1983–87)
Members of the Parliament of Finland (1987–91)
Members of the Parliament of Finland (1991–95)